Daikon is a computer program that detects likely invariants of programs. An invariant is a condition that always holds true at certain points in the program. It is mainly used for debugging programs in late development, or checking modifications to existing code.

Properties 
Daikon can detect properties in C, C++, Java, Perl, and IOA programs, as well as spreadsheet files or other data sources. Daikon is easy to extend and is free software.

External links 
 Daikon Official home site
 Source Repository on GitHub
 Dynamically Discovering Likely Program Invariants, Michael D. Ernst PhD. Thesis (using Daikon)

References 

Free computer programming tools
Static program analysis tools
Software testing